Layrisse is a commune in the Hautes-Pyrénées department in south-western France.

It has a land area of 3.33 square kilometers situated between Visker on the Northwest and Orincles on the Southeast.

See also
Communes of the Hautes-Pyrénées department

References

Communes of Hautes-Pyrénées